Desmodium intortum, known as greenleaf desmodium and also as beggarlice along with other members of its genus, is a species of flowering plant in the genus Desmodium, native to Mexico, Central America, northern South America, the Galápagos, Haiti and Jamaica. A nitrogen-fixing fodder crop, it has been introduced to the rest of the world's tropics, including Africa, India, Australia, New Guinea and Taiwan 

Desmodium intortum is used in push–pull agricultural pest management since it contains potent secondary metabolites that are released into the soil and aerially. Inter-cropped in maize and sorghum fields, it repels Chilo partellus, a stem-boring grass moth, and suppresses witchweeds, including Asiatic witchweed (Striga asiatica) and purple witchweed (S. hermonthica).

References

intortum
Forages
Plants described in 1920